Silicon tetrabromide, also known as tetrabromosilane, is the inorganic compound with the formula SiBr4.  This colorless liquid has a suffocating odor due to its tendency to hydrolyze with release of hydrogen bromide.  The general properties of silicon tetrabromide closely resemble those of the more commonly used silicon tetrachloride.

Comparison of SiX4
The properties of the tetrasilanes, all of which are tetrahedral, are significantly affected by nature of the halide.  These trends apply also to the mixed halides.  Melting points, boiling points, and bond lengths increase with the atomic mass of the halide.  The opposite trend is observed for the Si-X bond energies.

Lewis acidity
Covalently saturated silicon complexes like SiBr4, along with tetrahalides of germanium (Ge) and tin (Sn), are Lewis acids. Although silicon tetrahalides obey the octet rule, they add Lewis basic ligands to give adducts with the formula SiBr4L and SiBr4L2 (where L is a Lewis base).  The Lewis acidic properties of the tetrahalides tend to increase as follows: SiI4 < SiBr4 < SiCl4 < SiF4.  This trend is attributed to the relative electronegativities of the halogens.

The strength of the Si-X bonds decrease in the order: Si-F > Si-Cl > Si-Br > Si-I.

Synthesis
Silicon tetrabromide is synthesized by the reaction of silicon with hydrogen bromide at 600 °C.<ref name=booth>Schumb, W. B. Silicobromoform" Inorganic Syntheses 1939, volume 1, pp 38-42. .</ref>
Si + 4 HBr   →   SiBr4  +  2 H2
Side products include dibromosilane (SiH2Br2) and tribromosilane (SiHBr3).
Si + 2 HBr  →   SiH2Br2
Si + 3 HBr  →   SiHBr3 + H2

Reactivity
Like other halosilanes,  SiBr4 can be converted to hydrides, alkoxides, amides, and alkyls, i.e., products with the following functional groups: Si-H, Si-OR, Si-NR2, Si-R, and Si-X bonds respectively.

Silicon tetrabromide can be readily reduced by hydrides or complex hydrides.
4 R2AlH  +  SiBr4   →   SiH4  +  4 R2AlBr

Reactions with alcohols and amines proceed as follows:
SiBr4  +  4 ROH   →   Si(OR)4  +  4 HBr

SiBr4  +  8 HNR2   →   Si(NR2)4  +  4 HNR2HBr
Grignard reactions with metal alkyl halides are particularly important reactions due to their production of organosilicon compounds which can be converted to silicones.
SiBr4  +  n RMgX   →   RnSiBr4−n   +   n'' MgXBr

Redistribution reactions occur between two different silicon tetrahalides (as well as halogenated polysilanes) when heated to 100 ˚C, resulting in various mixed halosilanes.  The melting points and boiling points of these mixed halosilanes generally increase as their molecular weights increase. (Can occur with X= H, F, Cl, Br, and I)
2 SiBr4 + 2 SiCl4  →   SiBr3Cl + 2 SiBr2Cl2 + SiBrCl3
Si2Cl6  +  Si2Br6   →   Si2ClnBr6−n

Silicon tetrabromide hydrolyzes readily when exposed to air causing it to fume: 
SiBr4  +  2 H2O   →   SiO2  +  4 HBr

Silicon tetrabromide is stable in the presence of oxygen at room temperature, but bromosiloxanes form at 670–695 ˚C .
2 SiBr4 + 1⁄2 O2   →   Br3SiOSiBr3 + Br2

Uses
Due to its close similarity to silicon tetrachloride, there are few applications unique to SiBr4.  The pyrolysis of SiBr4 does have the advantage of depositing silicon at faster rates than that of SiCl4, however SiCl4 is usually preferred due to its availability in high purity. Pyrolysis of SiBr4 followed by treatment with ammonia yields silicon nitride (Si3N4) coatings, a hard compound used for ceramics, sealants, and the production of many cutting tools.

References

Bromides
Inorganic silicon compounds